A night school is a school which holds courses in the evenings or at night.

Night School may also refer to:

Literature
 "Night School", a short story by Raymond Carver included in the 1976 collection Will You Please Be Quiet, Please?
 Night School (play), a play by Harold Pinter
 Nightschool (manga), a 2008 original English-language manga written and illustrated by Svetlana Chmakova
Night School,  by Mari Mancusi 2011 
Night School,  by Caroline Cooney 1995 
Night School,  by Isobelle Carmody 2009
 Night School (novel), by Lee Child 2016 (Jack Reacher novel)
 Night School books by CJ Daugherty, 2012

Film and TV
"Night School", a 1949 episode of the TV series The Life of Riley
 Night School (1956 film), a 1956 Japanese film
 Night School (1981 film), a 1981 horror film
 Night School (2018 film), a 2018 comedy film
 Night School: the Web Series, a British web series

Music
Night School, jazz album by Stanley Clarke 2007
 "Night School", a track on Frank Zappa's 1986 album Jazz from Hell
"Nightschool" by Scottish band The Xcerts In the Cold Wind We Smile

Video games
Night School Studio, an American indie video game developer